Christianity is a third largest religion in Assam, a state of India in the north-eastern region. The population of Christians in Assam is 1,165,867 making up 3.74% of state population as of the 2011 census report, and it is also the second-fastest growing religion in Assam after Islam. The largest concentration of Christians in Assam can be found in Dima Hasao District where Christian population is about 30% and Karbi Anglong district where Christian population is about 16.5% as of the 2011 census report.

Two Portuguese Jesuit missionaries, Cabral and Cacella — the first Christian Missionaries to set foot in Assam — reached Hajo and Guwahati on September 26, 1626. They were en route to Tibet from Hooghly. There is no record of significant sharing of the gospel in Assam at this point.

The start of sustained missionary work in Assam seems to come with the arrival of Nathan Brown along with Oliver Cutter in 1836. They previously had been Christian missionaries in Burma. They carried a printing machine with them and first arrived in Sadiya, easternmost part of Assam. They started schools in Assamese and Khaamti languages and authored text books. They also started the translation of the New Testament into Assamese. But in 1839, due to Khamti rebellions, Brown along with Cutter left for Jaipur, India. They kept publishing in Assamese from there. The complete translation of the New Testament was first published in 1848 as 'Amaar Traankorta Jisu Christor Natun Niyom'. In 1854, he published 'Christor Biworon and Xhubho Bartaa'. He also translated a few prayers to Assamese. Brown started the translated of Bible he was finally completed in 1903 with other missionaries efforts.

Oliver Thomas Cutter was born in United States in 1811. He started his journey towards east in 1831 along with his wife Harriet Cutter. He first landed in Burma (Myanmar) and from there he crossed Patkai to reach Assam in 1836 along with Nathan Brown's family. He together with Browns started a printing press in Sadiya. They started to print books in Assamese, Khamti and Singfou language from there. They also started school and authored some text books for the schools. But due to Singfou rebellions, they were forced to leave Assam and go back to Jaipur. But they kept on publishing books from Jaipur. After few years, Cutter's family came back to Assam and this time settled down in Sibsagar. Miles Bronson came to Assam with friend Jacob Thomas in 1836. He first started his works in Sadiya, Jaipur and Naamsang. He started interacting with Naga tribes and first compiled 'East Naga' Thesaurus. According to historian Mccangie, no European after or before Bronson could get so close to Nagas. But he soon felt ill working with Nagas, so he finally came down to Nagaon via Sibsagar. In Assam, Bronson started working in both Christianism and local education. During the period from 1848 to 1851 and 1867 to 1871, he took vacation from his works and went back to New York. Miles Bronson was the main leader of the movement against government enforcing Bengali language as the official language in courts, school in Assam. In 1867, using Jaduram baruah's scripting, he published the first Assamese and English dictionary. The dictionary contained around 14 thousands words and published from Baptist Missionary Press, Sibsagar. This dictionary was another strong step in support of Assamese language. Bronson also started the translation of Bible to Assamese. Nidhiram Keot, the first native convert of the whole Northeastern region of India from the indigenous Keot(Kaibarta) community (an aboriginal tribe Sanskritised to a low position in the caste hierarchy), was baptised by Bronson on June 13, 1841 and took up the name Nidhi Levi Farewell.
 
Khasi and Garo are notable ethnic groups with a large Christian population. The Evangelical Lutheran Church in the Himalayan States has an Assam diocese since 2003, which used to be the Assam Church. Among the large Bengali population of Assam, there are few Christians.

Population

Trends
Percentage of Christians in Assam by decades

Population by district

Population by Tribes

Christian population in Assam by Tribes (2011)

List of denominations 

Sources

Association of Regular Independent Churches of India
Assam Baptist Convention

Boro Baptist Church Association
Boro Baptist Convention
Cachar Hill Tribes Presbyterian Synod
Christian Fellowship Centre
Church of Christ (Instrumental)
Church of God (Anderson)
Kuki Christian Church
Karbi-Anglong Baptist Convention
Lakher Independent Evangelical Church
North Bank Christian Association
Rabha Baptist Church Union
United Pentecostal Church in India
Biateram Presbyterian Synod
Cachar Christian Association

 Holy Christ Church, Tribon North East India
 Moravian Church, Binnakandi, Cachar
Christian Revival Church

See also
 List of Christian denominations in North East India
 Christianity in India
 Islam in Assam
Christian Revival Church

References

 
Religion in Assam